Harutyun Yenokyan (born 5 July 1985) is an Armenian Freestyle wrestler.

Yenokyan competed at the 2008 Summer Olympics in the men's freestyle 84 kg division. He qualified by placing third at the Olympic Qualification Tournament in Martigny, Switzerland. He progressed to the quarterfinal round of the competition, where he lost to Georgia's Revaz Mindorashvili, who was able to score four points at the end of the second period. Because Mindorashvili advanced further into the final match against Tajikistan's Yusup Abdusalomov, Yenokyan was given another chance at a bronze medal through a repechage bout, in which he lost to Germany's Davyd Bichinashvili, with a technical score of 3–4 and a classification score of 1–3.

References

External links
FILA Profile 
NBC Olympic Profile
Sports-Reference.com

1985 births
Living people
Sportspeople from Yerevan
Armenian male sport wrestlers
Olympic wrestlers of Armenia
Wrestlers at the 2008 Summer Olympics
21st-century Armenian people